Jacobus Tertius Delport (born 16 October 1939 in Humansdorp) is a former South African parliamentarian who played a significant role with Joe Slovo in drafting the new South African Constitution. Initially a member of the National Party, he later defected to the Democratic Party (now the Democratic Alliance).

Early life
He completed his BA LLB at the University of Stellenbosch and was awarded an LLD at the University of Port Elizabeth, where he also served as the Dean of Law Faculty (1976–87)

Political career
He entered politics in 1987 as an MP, serving as Minister of Local Government in President F.W. de Klerk's government.

On 9 February 2009, Delport delivered his farewell address to Parliament, critiquing President Kgalema Motlanthe's recent State of the Nation Address and lamenting what he called South Africa's "downward spiral".

References 

Living people
White South African people
Democratic Alliance (South Africa) politicians
Government ministers of South Africa
Stellenbosch University alumni
1939 births